The Loci communes (Commonplaces) or Capita theologica (Theological Chapters) is a Byzantine Greek florilegium containing a mix of Judeo-Christian and pagan selections. It was originally compiled in the late 9th or early 10th century and subsequently enlarged around the year 1000.

Misattributed to Maximus the Confessor, it was one of the most widely reproduced "sacro-profane" florilegia. Copies are preserved in some 90 manuscripts in three recensions: the original, the enlarged version and a later abridged version.

The quotations contained in the Loci communes are mostly edifying and apophthegmatic. They are grouped into 71 chapters.
The chapters may, very roughly, be arranged thematically. Within each chapter, quotations from the New Testament come first, followed by those from the Old Testament, the Church Fathers and finally pagan authors. Pagan authors outnumber Christian. Among the famous names are Thales, Pythagoras, Solon, Euripides, Socrates, Plato, Aristotle, Isocrates, Demosthenes, Diogenes, Philo, Epicurus and Menander. Topics of Christian dogma are not treated. The focus of the compilation is on ethics and human action, but its scope is broad, even encyclopedic. Its chapter headings are devoid of Christian references and appear to be inspired by those of the Anthologium  of  Stobaeus. Both works have a chapter entitled "Know thyself".

An Arabic translation, entitled Kitāb al-rawḍa (Book of the Garden), was made by ʿAbdallāh ibn al-Faḍl al-Anṭākī in the 11th century. It was completed no earlier than 1043. Ibn al-Faḍl used deliberately difficult language and provided glosses on his own translation. This extensive commentary by Ibn al-Faḍl sometimes misled past researchers to believe the entire text was his original compilation. The Kitāb al-rawḍa survives in at least eleven manuscripts. These do not contain the false attribution to Maximus. At least one 13th-century copy was abridged by removing most of the pagan sayings from the latter part of the work.

Editions

Ihm, Sibylle (ed.) Ps.-Maximus Confessor: Erste kritische Edition einer Redaktion des sacro-profanen Florilegiums Loci communes. Stuttgart, 2001.
Sargologos, Étienne (ed.) Florilège sacro-profane du Pseudo-Maxime. Hermoupolis, 2001.

Notes

References

Byzantine literature